Akeno may refer to:

Akeno, Ibaraki, a former town in Makabe District, Ibaraki Prefecture, Japan
Akeno, Yamanashi, a former village in Kitakoma District, Yamanashi Prefecture, Japan
Akeno Station, a railway station in Ise, Mie Prefecture, Japan
Akeno Air Field, a military aerodrome of the Japan Ground Self-Defense Force

People with the given name
, Japanese voice actress

Fictional characters:
, a character in the light novel series High School DxD
, protagonist of the anime television series High School Fleet
, a character in the manga series Seto no Hanayome

Japanese feminine given names